The discography of Russell Morris, an Australian singer-songwriter, who had five Australian top-10 singles during the late 1960s and early 1970s.
On 1 July 2008, the Australian Recording Industry Association (ARIA) recognised Morris' iconic status when he was inducted into the ARIA Hall of Fame.

Morris' highest charting album is the 2014 release, Van Diemen's Land, which peaked at number 4 on the Australian ARIA Chart.

See also Somebody's Image, Burns Cotton & Morris, Cotton Keays & Morris and The Morris Springfield Project.

Albums

Studio albums

Live albums

Compilation albums

Extended plays

Singles

References

External links

Official website

Discographies of Australian artists
Pop music discographies
Rock music discographies
Rhythm and blues discographies